Mirza Agha Muhammad Reza Baig, also known by his followers as Pir Ferutupi, was a Mughal nobleman and Shia Sufi pir from Sylhet, of Iranian origin. He overthrew the Kachari Kingdom and revolted against the East India Company with the assistance of the local peasantry.

Early life and background
The honorific title Mirza was added before his name and Baig as a suffix. This was the historical naming convention for the descendants of the Mughal dynasty. The Mughal Empire was defeated by the East India Company in the Battle of Plassey of 1757, and an anti-British sentiment was common among the natives of the Indian subcontinent and especially those related to and being descended from the noble dynasty such as Reza. His parents were Iranians and he was an adherent of Shia Islam.

Reza was based in the Sylhet region of northeastern Bengal. The Collector of Sylhet in the late 18th century, Robert Lindsay, described the Sylhet region as a "hotbed of resistance".

Activism

Invasion of Kachar

Reza was a Sufi pir, which enabled him to have the support of thousands of peasants, fakirs and ryots. It is said that he also gained support from Shams ud-Daulah, the Naib Nazim of Dhaka. He made an announcement calling for jihad against the British colonial rulers, who he preached were the reasons behind the problems that the peasants were facing.

In 1799, Reza marched with his followers from Sylhet to the western frontiers of the Kachari Kingdom. Referred to as his "hijrat", it is assumed that Reza planned to gather a larger following and secure a stronghold at Khaspur before facing the British in a war. Claiming to be the Mahdi (promised messiah) and twelfth imam, he promised to free the natives from oppression. Reza conspired with the local Naga and Kuki tribes, who were allied with the Kachari Raja Krishnachandra Narayan, and was able to convince them to join his side.

Raja Krishnachandra deployed several barqandaz (subalterns) to defeat Reza but they were all defeated by the large force, and he was subsequently expelled by Reza from his capital at Khaspur. In defeat, Krishnachandra fled to the nearby hills of northern Cachar, and some of his Hindus subjects were said to have gone into hiding in the forests of Cachar or migrated to Sylhet in fear of oppression. According to legend, Krishnachandra wrote many folk songs and poems during his hiding in the hills of northern Cachar.

Rule
After taking over the throne, many Bengali Hindus converted to Reza's doctrine, which was based on Shi'ite-Sufism , and gave allegiance to him. Reza declared independence, and invited other local zamindars and other to join him in his mission, promising them more land if they could liberate their homeland from the British colonial forces. According to Syed Enayatur Rahman, his ancestor, the Zamindar of Taraf Syed Riyazur Rahman was one of those zamindars invited by Reza. Reza also ordered his followers not to pay their taxes to the British East India Company. Reza's capital was said to have been situated in Hailakandi.

Defeat

After a short while, Reza deployed 1,200 of his men to attack the nearby thana of Bondassye (now Badarpur in Karimganj district) which was under the administration of an East India Company havildar and eight sepoys. He was also said to have attacked the Badarpur Fort.

Raja Krishnachandra, who had taken refuge with the British, notified them of Reza's attack. In response, a force was sent from Sylhet under the leadership of Kalyan Singh. The Kachari army also arrived with 300 men and two grasshopper cannons but were defeated by Reza's forces. On the other hand, Kalyan Singh had defeated Reza and became tempted to take control of Kachar himself. The British Collector of Sylhet, who gained a reinforcement of 70 sepoys, defeated Singh too and ended up in a brawl between the Kacharis. Eventually, the British-employed sepoys drove out the Kacharis and Reza's followers back, leading to 90 deaths in the Kachari side.

Reza escaped but was later arrested on 14 July being sent to a prison in Calcutta. He was given lifetime imprisonment for his crimes.

See also
Muharram Rebellion

Notes

References

Rulers of Sylhet
Indian people of Iranian descent
Indian Shia Muslims
Rebellious princes
Iranian rebels
Indian rebels
History of Sylhet
Mughal princes